Kal Chaudhvin Ki Raat Thi (کل چودھویں کی رات تھی) is a popular ghazal from the movie Khamoshi. It was originally sung by Jagjit Singh but the version by Ghulam Ali , Asad Amanat Ali and Abida Parveen is also popular. It is written by Ibn-e-Insha. This song was also sung by Kumar Sanu in the movie Jiyala, which was also a semihit in the 1990s. The song was also sung by Nighat Akbar on PTV (Pakistan Television) in 1970's before the separation of East Pakistan and becoming Bangladesh.

References

Ghazal songs
Year of song missing